Paul Pabst (Russian: Pavel Pabst) (15 May 1854 – 9 June 1897) was a pianist, composer, and Professor of Piano at Moscow Conservatory.

Life and career
Pabst was born Christian Georg Paul Pabst in 1854, into a family of musicians in the capital of East Prussia, Königsberg (now Kaliningrad). He studied piano with his father and then in Vienna with Anton Door and in Weimar with Franz Liszt. The young Pabst had a fortuitous meeting with Anton Rubinstein when he travelled to Königsberg as overseer of cultural programmes there.

Pabst moved to Riga, then in the Russian Empire, as an accomplished pianist in 1875.  In the autumn of 1878 he accepted an invitation from Nikolai Rubinstein to teach at the Moscow Imperial Conservatory. In Russia he was known as Pavel Augustovich Pabst. He was appointed Professor of Piano at the Conservatory in 1881 after Rubinstein's death, and taught there for the rest of his life. Amongst his pupils were Sergei Lyapunov, Nikolai Medtner and Alexander Goldenweiser.

Pyotr Ilyich Tchaikovsky frequently attended concerts given by Pabst, and used to refer to Pavel, as he was then known, as "a pianist of divine elegance", and "a pianist from God".  In 1884, Tchaikovsky appointed Pabst to edit his piano works for publication.

Pabst's students carried the great tradition of Russian romanticism into the 20th century. Pabst was considered one of the greatest pianists of his day, admired even by the great Franz Liszt. He and the young Sergei Rachmaninoff performed many concerts together. Until 2005 Pabst was known as a composer only for his piano transcriptions of the music for the ballet and opera by Tchaikovsky.  He also played the piano concerto by Anton Arensky, and was the soloist at its premiere.  Pabst's piano transcriptions were admired by the most outstanding pianists of the time, and were considered to be on a par with those by Liszt himself.

Paul Pabst died suddenly in 1897 in Moscow and was buried at Vvedenskoye Cemetery. His funeral wreath from the Russian Musical Society contained the epitaph: "To Honored Artist - Indefatigable Professor - Hardly simply a man".

Original compositions
In 1885 he wrote his only orchestral work, the Piano Concerto in E-flat major.  Its first performances were in St. Petersburg and Moscow, with Pabst as soloist, and with Anton Rubinstein conducting.  The score was then lost, but has since been discovered. Pabst's Piano Concerto is a virtuoso showpiece in three movements, lasting 33 minutes, full of wonderful tunes and a fiendishly difficult but lyrical solo part.

On 19 April 2005, 120 years after its premiere, Pabst's 'Lost Concerto' was performed by Panagiotis Trochopoulos at a concert given in Minsk by the Belarusian State Academic Symphony Orchestra, conducted by Marius Stravinsky.  A live recording was made by producer David Kent-Watson, and filmed for the documentary 'The Lost Concerto'. 
This live recording was used for the world premiere CD release of Pavel Pabst's Piano Concerto on Cameo Classics CC9033CD. A second recording was released by the Danacord label in 2008, with Oleg Marshev as the soloist.

Pabst also wrote a Trio in A major for piano, violin and cello, dedicated to Anton Rubinstein.

References

External links
paul-pabst.com website

1854 births
1897 deaths
Military personnel from Königsberg
People from the Province of Prussia
Russian male composers
Russian classical pianists
Male classical pianists
Academic staff of Moscow Conservatory
19th-century German composers
19th-century classical pianists
19th-century male musicians
Burials at Vvedenskoye Cemetery